Veedum is an unincorporated community located in the town of Dexter, Wood County, Wisconsin, United States.

History
Veedum was founded in 1887 when the railroad was extended to that point. The name may be a transfer from Vedum, in Sweden. A post office opened at Veedum in 1901, and remained in operation until 1917. Railroad service to Veedum ended in 1933.

Notes

External links
 1909 plat map of Veedum
 1928 plat map

Unincorporated communities in Wood County, Wisconsin
Unincorporated communities in Wisconsin